S. Venkatarama Iyer was an Indian politician and former Member of the Legislative Assembly of Tamil Nadu. He was elected to the Tamil Nadu legislative assembly as an Indian National Congress candidate from Adirampattinam constituency in  1952 election.

References 

Indian National Congress politicians from Tamil Nadu
Year of birth missing
Place of birth missing
Year of death missing
Madras MLAs 1952–1957